"Freedom on the Wallaby", Henry Lawson's well known poem, was written as a comment on the 1891 Australian shearers' strike and published by William Lane in the Worker in Brisbane, 16 May 1891. 

The last two stanzas of the poem were read out by Frederick Brentnall MP on 15 July 1891 in the Queensland Legislative Council during a 'Vote of Thanks' to the armed police who broke up the Barcaldine strike camp. There were calls in the chamber for Lawson's arrest for sedition. Lawson wrote a bitter rejoinder to Brentnall, The Vote of Thanks Debate.

The "Rebel flag" referred to in the poem is the Eureka Flag that was first raised at the Eureka Stockade in 1854, above the Shearers' strike camp in 1891 and carried on the first Australian May Day march in Barcaldine on 1 May 1891.

"Australia's a big country

An' Freedom's humping bluey,

An' Freedom's on the wallaby

Oh! don't you hear 'er cooey?

She's just begun to boomerang,

She'll knock the tyrants silly,

She's goin' to light another fire

And boil another billy.

"Our fathers toiled for bitter bread

While loafers thrived beside 'em,

But food to eat and clothes to wear,

Their native land denied 'em.

An' so they left their native land

In spite of their devotion,

An' so they came, or if they stole,

Were sent across the ocean.

"Then Freedom couldn't stand the glare

O' Royalty's regalia,

She left the loafers where they were,

An' came out to Australia.

But now across the mighty main

The chains have come ter bind her –

She little thought to see again

The wrongs she left behind her.

"Our parents toil'd to make a home 

Hard grubbin 'twas an' clearin' 

‘'They wasn't crowded much with lordsWhen they was pioneering.But now that we have made the landA garden full of promise,Old Greed must crook 'is dirty handAnd come ter take it from us.So we must fly a rebel flag,As others did before us,And we must sing a rebel songAnd join in rebel chorus.We'll make the tyrants feel the stingO' those that they would throttle;They needn't say the fault is oursIf blood should stain the wattle!''"

 (The last two stanzas as read by Frederick Brentnall)

References
 Union Songs

1891 poems
Poetry by Henry Lawson